, also known simply as Evangelion or Eva, is a Japanese mecha anime television series produced by Gainax and animated by Tatsunoko, directed by Hideaki Anno and broadcast on TV Tokyo from October 1995 to March 1996. Evangelion is set fifteen years after a worldwide cataclysm named Second Impact, particularly in the futuristic fortified city of Tokyo-3. The protagonist is Shinji Ikari, a teenage boy who is recruited by his father Gendo to the shadowy organization Nerv to pilot a giant bio-machine mecha named Evangelion into combat against beings known as Angels.

The series explores the experiences and emotions of Evangelion pilots and members of Nerv as they try to prevent Angels from causing more cataclysms. In the process, they are called upon to understand the ultimate causes of events and the motives for human action. The series has been described as a deconstruction of the mecha genre and it features archetypal imagery derived from Shinto cosmology as well as Jewish and Christian mystical traditions, including Midrashic tales and Kabbalah. The psychoanalytic accounts of human behavior put forward by Freud and Jung are also prominently featured.

Neon Genesis Evangelion received critical acclaim but was also subject to controversy. Particular controversy centered on the final two episodes of the series, as the ending was deemed confusing and abstract to many viewers and critics alike. In 1997, Hideaki Anno and Gainax released the feature film The End of Evangelion, which serves as an alternate ending replacing the final two episodes. A series of four films, titled Rebuild of Evangelion, retelling the events of the series with different plot elements and a new ending, were released between 2007 and 2021.

Plot

In 2015, fifteen years after a global cataclysm known as the Second Impact, teenager Shinji Ikari is summoned to the futuristic city of Tokyo-3 by his estranged father Gendo Ikari, director of the special paramilitary force Nerv. Shinji witnesses United Nations forces battling an Angel, one of a race of giant monstrous beings whose awakening was foretold by the Dead Sea Scrolls. Because of the Angels' near-impenetrable force-fields, Nerv's giant Evangelion bio-machines, synchronized to the nervous systems of their pilots and possessing their own force-fields, are the only weapons capable of keeping the Angels from annihilating humanity. Nerv officer Misato Katsuragi escorts Shinji into the Nerv complex beneath the city, where his father pressures him into piloting the Evangelion Unit-01 against the Angel. Without training, Shinji is quickly overwhelmed in the battle, causing the Evangelion to go berserk and savagely kill the Angel on its own.

Following hospitalization, Shinji moves in with Misato and settles into life in Tokyo-3. In his second battle, Shinji destroys an Angel but runs away afterward, distraught. Misato confronts Shinji and he decides to remain a pilot. The Nerv crew and Shinji must then battle and defeat the remaining fourteen Angels to prevent the Third Impact, a global cataclysm that would destroy the world. Evangelion Unit-00 is repaired shortly afterward. Shinji tries to befriend its pilot, the mysterious, socially isolated teenage girl Rei Ayanami. With Rei's help, Shinji defeats another Angel. They are then joined by the pilot of Evangelion Unit-02, the multitalented but insufferable teenager Asuka Langley Sōryu, who is German-Japanese-American. Together, the three of them manage to defeat several Angels. As Shinji adjusts to his new role as a pilot, he gradually becomes more confident and self-assured. Asuka moves in with Shinji, and they begin to develop confusing feelings for one another, kissing at her provocation.

After being absorbed by an Angel, Shinji breaks free thanks to Eva acting on its own. He is later forced to fight an infected Evangelion Unit-03 and watches its pilot, his friend and classmate Toji Suzuhara, become incapacitated and permanently disabled. Asuka loses her self-confidence following a defeat and spirals into depression. This is worsened by her next fight, against an Angel which attacks her mind and forces her to relive her worst fears and childhood trauma, resulting in a mental breakdown. In the next battle, Rei self-destructs Unit-00 and dies to save Shinji's life. Misato and Shinji visit the hospital where they find Rei alive but claiming she is "the third Rei". Misato forces scientist Ritsuko Akagi to reveal the dark secrets of Nerv, the Evangelion boneyard, and the Dummy Plug system which operates using clones of Rei, who was herself created with the DNA of Shinji's mother, Yui Ikari. This succession of events leaves Shinji emotionally scarred and alienated from the rest of the characters. Kaworu Nagisa replaces the catatonic Asuka as the pilot of Unit-02. Kaworu, who initially befriends Shinji and gains his trust, is in truth the final foretold Angel, Tabris. Kaworu fights Shinji, then realizes that he must die if humanity is to survive and asks Shinji to kill him. Shinji hesitates but eventually kills Kaworu; the event makes Shinji overridden with guilt.

After the final Angel is defeated, Gendo triggers the "Human Instrumentality Project", a forced evolution of humanity in which the souls of all mankind are merged for benevolent purposes, believing that if unified, humanity could finally overcome the loneliness and alienation that has eternally plagued mankind. Shinji's soul grapples with the reason for his existence and reaches an epiphany that he needs others to thrive, enabling him to destroy the wall of negative emotions that torment him and reunite with the others, who congratulate him.

Characters

Hideaki Anno attempted to create characters that reflected parts of his own personality. The characters of Evangelion struggle with their interpersonal relationships, their personal problems, and traumatic events in their past. The human qualities of the characters have enabled some viewers of the show to identify with the characters on a personal level, while others interpret them as historical, religious, or philosophical symbols.

Shinji Ikari is the series protagonist and the designated pilot of Evangelion Unit-01. After witnessing his mother Yui Ikari's death as a child, Shinji is abandoned by his father, Gendo Ikari. He is emotionally hypersensitive and sometimes does as expected out of fear of rejection, but he has often rebelled and refused to pilot the Eva because of the excruciating harm that has been done to him or to his friends. Throughout the series, he says to himself "I mustn't run away" as a means of encouraging himself to face the threats of the day, and this sometimes actually gives him bravery in battle, but he has a lingering habit of withdrawing in response to traumatic events. Anno has described Shinji as a boy who "shrinks from human contact" and has "convinced himself that he is a completely unnecessary person".

The withdrawn and mysterious pilot of Evangelion Unit-00, Rei Ayanami, is a clone made from the salvaged remains of Yui and is plagued by a sense of negative self-worth stemming from the realization that she is an expendable asset. She at first despises Shinji for his lack of trust in his father Gendo, with whom Rei is very close. However, after Shinji and Rei successfully defeat the Angel Ramiel, she takes a friendly liking to him. Towards the end of the series, it is revealed that she is one of many clones, whose use is to replace the currently existing Rei if she is killed.

Asuka Langley Soryu is a child prodigy who pilots Evangelion Unit-02 and possesses a fiery temper and an overabundance of pride and self-confidence, which often gets her in trouble and difficulty, especially during battles. As a little girl, Asuka discovered the body of her mother shortly after she committed suicide, leading the child to repress her emotions and vow never to cry. Asuka and Shinji develop intense but ambiguous feelings toward each other having difficulty reaching out to others. Their relationship was initially modeled on the one between Jean, Nadia's love interest and eventual husband in the earlier Nadia. Similarly to Shinji, Asuka and Rei are presented with their own flaws and difficulty relating to other people.

Misato Katsuragi is the caretaker and commanding officer for Shinji and Asuka. Her professional demeanor at Nerv contrasts dramatically with her carefree and irresponsible behavior at home. Character designer Yoshiyuki Sadamoto conceived her as an older "girl next door" and promiscuous loser who failed to take life seriously. Hideaki Anno described Shinji and Misato as "afraid of being hurt" and "unsuitable—lacking the positive attitude—for what people call heroes of an adventure."

The teenage Evangelion pilots are ordered into battle by the steely Gendo Ikari, Shinji's father and the commander of Nerv. He abandoned Shinji and recalled him only to serve as an Evangelion pilot. Gendo salvaged the remains of his dead wife's body to create Rei, whom he viewed as a mere tool at his disposal to defeat the Angels and enact Instrumentality. Similar to Shinji, he is somewhat asocial and is afraid of being insulted by others and often runs away from such, often committing immoralities in the process. This fear is also what drove him to abandon Shinji. He is depicted as relentless in his drive to win, a man who "takes drastic and extreme measures, by fair means or foul, or by hook or by crook, in order to accomplish his own purpose." According to Yoshiyuki Sadamoto, the characters of Gendo and Fuyutsuki are based on Ed Straker and Alec Freeman of the television series UFO. Sadamoto designed the visual appearance of the characters so that their personalities "could be understood more or less at a glance". The distinctive aesthetic appeal of the female lead characters' designs contributed to the high sales of Neon Genesis Evangelion merchandise. The design of Rei, in particular, became so popular that the media referred to the character as "Premium Girl" due to the high sales of books with Rei on the cover.

Production
Director Hideaki Anno fell into a depression following the completion of work on Nadia: The Secret of Blue Water and the 1992 failure of the Royal Space Force: The Wings of Honnêamise sequel project, Blue Uru. According to Yasuhiro Takeda, after the failure of Blue Uru Anno agreed to a collaboration between King Records and Gainax while drinking with King representative Toshimichi Ōtsuki; King Records guaranteed Anno a time slot for "something, anything". Anno began the development of the new series in 1993 around the notion of not running away, which had been the underlying theme of Aoki Uru, which focused on a protagonist accustomed to avoiding personal responsibility who finds himself trying to save the heroine of the story. Early into the production, he stated his intent to have Evangelion increase the number of anime fans, named otaku in Japanese, and attract interest in the anime medium bringing a breath of fresh air to the mecha genre. In the early design phase of the Evangelion project, several formats were considered, including a film, a television series and an original video animation (OVA) series. The producers finally opted for the television series, as it was the most widely accessible media in Japan at that time. Anno also originally proposed the title Alcion for the new series, but this was rejected due to its lack of hard consonant sounds. He conceived the series as a metaphor of his four-year depression, as he tried to put his whole self into the work and imprint his own feelings on the film.

Critics noted how Evangelion borrowed certain scenarios and the use of introspection as a narrative device from a previous Anno project entitled Gunbuster. He also incorporated the narrative structure of Nadia and multiple frames of reference, leaving the story open to interpretation. The production was complex and saw several changes to the scenario initially imagined by Gainax. A female protagonist was initially proposed for the series, but the idea was scrapped. In the first scenario, the first episode presented the battle between an Angel and Rei, while the character of Shinji was only introduced after the Angel had been temporarily defeated. Further changes to the plot were made following the Aum Shinrikyo sect's sarin gas attack on the Tokyo subway in March. Azuma Hiroki has said that the original Evangelion story was "too close to reality" from Anno's point of view. Anno thought that the original scenario was not suitable for broadcasting, and he feared censorship. However, he also criticized Aum Shinrikyo, because "they lost any contact with reality". For this reason, Azuma stated that Evangelion "is an intrinsic critique of Aum".

The final version of the story reflects inspiration drawn from numerous other anime and fictional works. Chief among these are Space Battleship Yamato, Mobile Suit Gundam, Devilman and Space Runaway Ideon. The series also incorporates tributes to Childhood's End, the novels of Ryū Murakami, The Andromeda Strain, The Divine Invasion, the poem Pippa Passes, The Hitcher, and several television series including The Prisoner, Thunderbirds, Ultraman and Ultra Seven.

The development of the Neon Genesis Evangelion series ran close to deadlines throughout its production run. The initial cuts of the first two episodes were screened at the second Gainax festival in July 1995, only three months before they were aired on television. By the thirteenth episode the series began to deviate significantly from the original story, and the initial project was abandoned. The number of Angels was reduced to seventeen instead of the original twenty-eight; the writers also changed the story's ending, which had originally described the failure of the Human Instrumentality Project after an Angel attack from the Moon. Not only did the series suffer from scheduling issues, but according to Anno, despite Gainax being the lead studio for the series, the company itself had inadequate materials and staff for the full production of the series. Only three staff members from Gainax were working on the series at any given time, and the majority of the series' production was outsourced to Tatsunoko Production.

Starting with the sixteenth episode, the show changed drastically, discarding the grand narrative concerning salvation for a narrative focusing on the individual characters. This change coincided with Anno's development of an interest in psychology after a friend lent him a book on mental illness. This focus culminated in a psychoanalysis of the characters in the two final episodes. Necessity forced Anno to abandon the script of the twenty-fifth episode to work with a new one. These episodes feature heavy use of abstract animation, flashbacks, simple line drawings, photographs and fixed image scenes with voice-over dialogue. Some critics speculated that these unconventional animation choices resulted from budget cuts, but Toshio Okada stated that it wasn't only a problem of schedule or budget, since Anno "couldn't decide the ending until the time came. That's his style". These two episodes sparked controversy and condemnation among fans and critics of the series. In 1997, Hideaki Anno and Gainax released two animated feature films, providing another ending for the show, named Death & Rebirth and The End of Evangelion.

Themes

References to mystical traditions in Judaism and Christianity, including Midrashic literature and Kabbalah, are threaded liberally through the series. Complicating viewers' attempts to form an unambiguous interpretation, the series reworks Midrash stories, Zohar images and other Kabbalistic ideas developed from the Book of Genesis to create a new Evangelion-specific mythology. The plot also combines elements of esotericism and mysticism of the Jewish Kabbalah, including the Angels, which have common and individual features with the Angels of the religious tradition, such as Sachiel, Sandalphon and Ramiel. Assistant director Kazuya Tsurumaki stated the religious visual references were intended to make the series more "interesting" and "exotic" for a Japanese audience, denying the existence of a religious meaning for the use of Christian visual symbols in the show. According to Anno, "as the symbols are mixed together, for the first time something like an interrelationship or a meaning emerges".

According to Patrick Drazen, numerous allusions to the Kojiki and the Nihongi have a prominent role in Evangelion, along with the Shinto vision of the primordial cosmos and the mythical lances of the Shinto deities Izanagi and Izanami. Elements of the Judeo-Christian tradition also feature prominently throughout the series, including references to Adam, Lilith, Eve, the Lance of Longinus, the Dead Sea Scrolls, the Kabbalistic concept of Adam Kadmon, and the Tree of Life. The merging of all human souls into one through the Human Instrumentality Project at the end of the series has been compared to the Kabbalistic concept of tikkun olam. The Evangelions have been likened to the golem of Jewish folklore, and their visual design resembles the traditional depictions of oni, Japanese demons or ogres.

Neon Genesis Evangelion has been interpreted as a deeply personal expression of Hideaki Anno's own emotional struggles with depression. During the production of the series, he became interested in mental illness and psychology. According to him, Rei is a schizophrenic character and a representation of Shinji's unconscious, while Shinji has an Oedipus complex and is characterized by a libido-destrudo conflict. Similarly, Ritsuko has an Electra complex, in which she loves Gendo, a sort of substitute for her father figure. Anno himself stated that he identifies with Shinji in both a conscious and unconscious manner, while Rei is Anno's "deepest part" and Kaworu his Jungian shadow. Shinji's entering into Unit-01 has been interpreted as a Freudian "return to the womb", and his struggle to be free of the Eva as his "rite of passage" into manhood. The series also contains references to philosophical and psychoanalytic concepts, such as the oral stage, introjection, oral personality, ambivalence, and the death drive, including elements of the works of Sigmund Freud, Arthur Schopenhauer, and Søren Kierkegaard.

Related media

Films

In May 1996, Gainax announced an Evangelion film in response to fan dissatisfaction with the series finale. On March 15, 1997, Gainax released Evangelion: Death & Rebirth, consisting of 60 minutes of clips taken from the first 24 episodes of the series and the first 30 minutes of the new ending due to production issues. The second film, The End of Evangelion, which premiered on July 19, 1997, provided the complete new ending as a retelling of the final two episodes of the television series. Rather than depicting the series' climax within the characters' minds, the film provides a more conventional, action-based resolution to the series' plot lines. The film won numerous awards and grossed 1.45 billion yen within six months of its release. Ex.org ranked the film in 1999 as the fifth best 'All-Time Show', with the television series at the second. In 2009, CUT magazine ranked it the third greatest anime film of all time. In July 1998, the films were re-released as Revival of Evangelion which combined Death(true)² (the director's cut of Death) with The End of Evangelion.

A new animated film series called Rebuild of Evangelion by Gainax was made, consisting of four movies. The first film retells the first six episodes from the series but from the second film onward the story is different, including new characters, Evas and Angels. The first film, Evangelion: 1.0 You Are (Not) Alone, was released in Japan on September 1, 2007, with Evangelion: 2.0 You Can (Not) Advance released on June 27, 2009, and Evangelion: 3.0 You Can (Not) Redo released on November 17, 2012. The final film, titled Evangelion: 3.0+1.0 Thrice Upon a Time, was released on March 8, 2021, after two delays. In 2015, Evangelion:Another Impact, a 3D-rendered short film collaboration between the Khara studio and the media company Dwango was directed by Shinji Aramaki, released and streamed as the twelfth anime short from the Japan Animator Expo on February 8. It depicts "the story of an Evangelion's activation, rampage and howling in another world".

Manga and books

Ten months prior to the television broadcast of Evangelion, the character designer Yoshiyuki Sadamoto illustrated a manga version of the story, initially a supplement meant to promote the anime series. The first installment of the manga was published in the February issue of Shōnen Ace in December 1994 with subsequent installments produced on an irregular basis over an eighteen-year period. The final installment was published in June 2013. Several publishers were initially concerned at the selection of Sadamoto to develop the manga adaptation, viewing him as "too passé to be bankable". The first ten volumes sold over 15 million copies, and the eleventh volume reached number one on the Tohan charts, selling an additional two million copies. The manga series won the 1996 Comicker fan manga poll. The story has been adapted into several other manga series in addition to the original Sadamoto project, including Campus Apocalypse, a mystery story that omits the Evangelion units, and Petit Eva: Evangelion@School, a parody series which received its own original net animation serial show.

Soundtracks and music

Shirō Sagisu composed most of the original music for the series. The soundtracks released to high rankings on the Oricon charts, with Neon Genesis Evangelion III reaching the number one slot for highest sales in 1997; that same year, Sagisu received the Kobe Animation award for "Best Music Score" for his work on Evangelion. Classical music by Ludwig van Beethoven, Johann Sebastian Bach, Giuseppe Verdi and George Frideric Handel were also featured throughout the series and the movies.

Additional classical works and original symphonic compositions were used to score later movies produced within the Neon Genesis Evangelion franchise. In total, the series' discography includes twenty-one full studio, live, compilation and soundtrack albums and six CD singles. The series' opening theme is "A Cruel Angel's Thesis", performed by Yoko Takahashi. It ranked on two TV Asahi polls, reaching 55th for best anime theme songs of all time, and eighteenth for best anime theme songs of the 1990s. Fifteen years after its release, the theme won JASRAC's annual award for the royalties it continues to generate from its usage in pachinko, pachislo, karaoke and other venues. The ending theme of the series is "Fly Me to the Moon", arranged and sung by Claire Littley and various other singers from the main vocal cast.

Video games

Several video games based on the series have been developed, ranging from RPG and adventure games to mahjong and card games. The series has also spawned visual novels, two of which inspired the romance and comedy-focused manga series Angelic Days and Shinji Ikari Raising Project.

Releases

Japan

The original home video releases in Japan included VHS and Laserdisc sets using a release structured around "Genesis 0:(volume number)", with each of the first twelve releases containing two episodes each. Each of the episodes received minor changes and episodes from the twenty-first to the twenty-fourth were extended with new scenes. "Genesis 0:13" and "Genesis 0:14" contained the original and the alternate versions of the last two episodes first presented in Neon Genesis Evangelion: The End of Evangelion. A fifteenth and final release for Laserdisc, entitled "Genesis 0:X", contained the broadcast versions of the episodes from the twenty-first to the twenty-fourth and was a special mail-in offer for fans who purchased all fourteen discs.

The first Japanese DVD release was spread across seven volumes; all contained four episodes, with the seventh volume containing both the original and alternate versions of the last two episodes. This version was identical to the previous laserdisc and VHS release. The movies were also released as a special set, just like before. In 2000 and 2001, three box sets were released to commemorate the fictional Second Impact which occurred in the year 2000 in the series. The Second Impact Box contained the original episodes and both movies on nine DVDs — three per Box. The versions were the original broadcast and theatrical versions respectively and therefore different from the previous DVD release. In addition, the video game Girlfriend of Steel was included in the third box set.

The Japanese-only, nine-volume "Renewal of Evangelion" DVDs were released on June 25, 2003, with improved acoustic effects, remixed dialogue and remastered soundtrack for 5.1 stereo sound. The first eight volumes covered the original twenty-six episodes, including two versions of episodes from the twenty-first to the twenty-fourth: the extended video version that was available in previous releases, and a reconstruction of the shorter broadcast version, which was made available for the first time since the Genesis 0:X laserdisc and also wasn't censored like in the original broadcast. The ninth volume contained Death(true)², while the tenth included End of Evangelion (omitting Rebirth). The Renewal Project release formed the basis for the western "Platinum Edition". On December 1, 2014, Studio Khara announced a Blu-ray boxset containing a new HD-remastering of the television series, the video versions of the episodes from the twenty-first to the twenty-fourth, as well as the two movies, both as Revival of Evangelion, the director's cut, which was available in the Renewal DVDs, and as their original theatrical versions Death and Rebirth and The End of Evangelion.

Another DVD set, titled Archives of Evangelion, was announced. It contains the original unaltered broadcast version of the television series as well as the broadcast version of Death (True) & Rebirth that aired on January 2, 1998. Both sets were released on August 26, 2015, to commemorate the twentieth anniversary of the TV series.

ADV Films
The series was distributed in North America and Europe by ADV Films. The thirteen English VHS tapes, released from August 20, 1996, to July 7, 1998, contained two episodes each and were released using the same "Genesis 0:(volume number)" titling convention as the first Japanese home video release. Two laserdisc collections were released as Collection 1 Deluxe Edition and Collection 2 Deluxe Edition, containing episodes one to four and five to eight, respectively. The first DVD release by ADV Films was the eight-disk Perfect Collection in 2002, containing the original installments. In 2004, ADV released two DVD compilations titled Neon Genesis Evangelion: Resurrection and Neon Genesis: Reborn, encompassing the directors' cuts of episodes from the twenty-first to the twenty-fourth.

The Platinum Edition release was announced by ADV in 2004, consisting of seven DVDs released between July 27, 2004, and April 19, 2005. The Platinum Edition contained the original twenty-six episodes and the four "Director's cut" versions of episodes from the twenty-first to the twenty-fourth. A six-disc version of the Platinum Edition, the Platinum Complete Edition, was released on November 22, 2005, and omitted several extras included in other versions, including commentary and trailers. A seven-disc Platinum Perfect Collection tin case version was released on November 27, 2007, and included the extras that were omitted from the Platinum Complete Edition. On November 18, 2008, a seven-disc Holiday Edition DVD was released; this would be the final DVD release of the series from ADV Films. In late November 2011, it was announced the series was going out of print.

Madman Anime
Madman has held the rights to the series since 1998 in New Zealand and Australia, where Evangelion was broadcast in 1999 by the Special Broadcasting Service. Madman Anime also holds the home video licences for the Rebuild of Evangelion films.

Netflix
On November 26, 2018, streaming company Netflix announced that it had acquired the worldwide streaming rights to the original anime series, as well as Evangelion: Death (True)² and The End of Evangelion, for release in Q2 2019. On March 22, 2019, Netflix announced a June 21, 2019 premiere date for the titles. Following the dissolution of ADV Films in late 2009, the Netflix release includes a re-translated script from Studio Khara's in-house translator Dan Kanemitsu and a new English-language cast chosen by Khara. The Netflix release omits "Fly Me to the Moon" in some regions due to licensing issues.

Anime Limited and GKIDS
On May 30, 2020, British anime distributor Anime Limited announced it had acquired home video distribution rights for the original series, Evangelion: Death (True)² and The End of Evangelion in the United Kingdom and Ireland, with an Ultimate Edition Blu-ray release scheduled for 2021, marking the international release of the original series on Blu-ray. On October 3, 2020, North American anime distributor GKIDS announced it had licensed the original TV series, Death (True)² and The End of Evangelion for home video, theatrical, and digital download release with an Ultimate Edition to be released in 2021, making this the first Blu-ray release of the franchise in North America. On August 30, 2021, GKIDS announced a Collector's Edition and a Standard edition release in addition to the Ultimate Edition. The Collector's/Ultimate edition had the "Classic Dub and Subtitled Version", including the ADV and Manga English dubs and subs, while the standard edition was only included the Netflix English dub and sub. "Fly Me to the Moon" was not included in any of the GKIDS/All the Anime releases. The Standard edition was released on November 9, 2021, while the Collector's/Ultimate edition was released on December 8, 2021. On November 2, 2021, GKIDS released the TV series, Death (True)² and The End of Evangelion on all major digital download services six days ahead of the Standard Blu-ray release. This release, like the Standard BD, only contains the Netflix dub and sub.

Reception

Neon Genesis Evangelion received critical acclaim both domestically and internationally during its initial broadcast and in the decades since its release. On review aggregator Rotten Tomatoes, the series has an approval rating of 100% based on 31 reviews, with an average rating of 8.3/10. The website's critical consensus reads, "Neon Genesis Evangelion, both a cultural touchstone for Japan and an uncompromising auteurist vision by creator Hideaki Anno, doubles as an enthralling apex for the mecha anime genre and as a harrowing exploration of depression – making for a wholly singular epic about angels and inner demons."

The "richness" of the characters and "complex and layered" narrative has received praise by critics. In 1998, Max Autohead of Hyper rated it 10 out of 10, praising the "brilliant and fantastic storyline, with amazing characters who pull you not only into their world, but into their psyche as well. The same year, Shidoshi of GameFan magazine gave it an A rating, calling it an "awesome" series. Mike Hale of The New York Times described it in 2009 as "a superior anime, a giant-robot tale of unusual depth, feeling and detail."

Following the conclusion of the series' original television broadcast, the public and critical reception to Neon Genesis Evangelion was polarized, particularly with regard to the final two episodes. The experimental style of the finale confused or alienated many fans and spawned debate and controversy; the criticism was largely directed toward the lack of storyline resolution in the final two episodes. Opinion on the finale was mixed, with the audience broadly divided between those who considered the episodes "deep", and those who felt their meaning was "more apparent than real". The English voice actors admitted that they also had trouble understanding the series' conclusion. The Mainichi Times wrote that broadcast of the penultimate episode,, "nearly all viewers felt betrayed ... When commentator Eiji Ōtsuka sent a letter to the Yomiuri Shimbun, complaining about the end of the Evangelion series, the debate went nationwide." Despite the criticism, Anno stood by his artistic choices for the series' conclusion. Critic Zac Bertschy remarked in 2003 that "Most of the backlash against Evangelion existed because people don't like to think". The initial controversy surrounding the end of Evangelion has had no lasting negative influence on the popularity of the series.

Evangelion has developed into a social phenomenon beyond its primary fan base, generating national discussion in Japan. The series has also been the subject of numerous media reports, debates, and research studies worldwide. The show has received review by critics, academics and sociologists alike, including by Susan J. Napier, William Rout, Mick Broderick, Mari Kotani, Shinji Miyadai, Hiroki Azuma, Yuriko Furuhata, and Marc Steinberg. The series has been described as both a critique and deconstruction of the mecha genre. Japanese critic Manabu Tsuribe considered that Evangelion was "extremely interior and is lacking in sociality, so that it seems to reflect pathology of the times." Anime News Network's Martin Theron described the character design as "distinctive, designed to be sexy rather than cutesy", and the mecha designs as "among the most distinctive ever produced for an anime series, with sleek, lithe appearances that look monstrous, fearsome, and nimble rather than boxy and knight-like". Mike Crandol stated "It no longer seems contrite to say that Evangelion is surely one of the all-time great works of animation". In February 2004 Cinefantastique listed the anime as one of the "10 Essential Animations".

Awards
Neon Genesis Evangelion has scored highly in popularity polls. In 1996, the series won first place in the "Best Loved Series" category of the Anime Grand Prix, a reader-polled award series published in Animage magazine. The show was again awarded this prize in 1997 by a large margin. The End of Evangelion won first place in 1998, making Neon Genesis Evangelion the first anime franchise to win three consecutive first place awards. The website IGN ranked Evangelion as the tenth best animated series in its "Top 100 Animated TV Series" list. The series also placed third in Animages "anime that should be remembered in the 21st Century". In 1998, EX.org's readers voted Neon Genesis Evangelion the best US anime release and in 1999, the second-best show of all time. In 2007, a large-scale survey poll by TV Asahi voted Evangelion as the second most appreciated anime in Japan. The series was also ranked as the most popular of all time in a 2006 survey of 80,000 attendees at the Japan Media Arts Festival.

Evangelion won the Animation Kobe award in 1996, and 1997. The series was also awarded the eighteenth Nihon SF Taisho Award and the Excellence Award at the first Japan Media Arts Festival in 1997, while the film ranked sixth on Wizard's Anime Magazine on their "Top 50 Anime released in North America". In the August 1996 issue of Animage, Evangelion characters placed high in the rankings of best characters with Rei ranked first, Asuka third, Kaworu fourth and Shinji sixth. Rei Ayanami won in the Female Character category in 1995 and 1996 and Shinji Ikari won the Male Character category in 1996 and 1997. In 2010, Newtype magazine recognized Rei Ayanami as the most popular character of the 1990s in the female category, and Shinji Ikari in the male category. "A Cruel Angel's Thesis" won the Animage award in the Best Song category in 1996, and TV Asahi recognized it as the 18th best anime song since 1990. TV Asahi also recognized the "suicide of Ayanami Rei" as the ninth most touching anime scene ever.

Influence and legacy
Evangelion has had a significant impact on Japanese popular culture. The series also had a strong influence on anime, at a time when the anime industry and televised anime series were in a slump period. CNET reviewer Tim Hornyak credits the series with revitalizing and transforming the giant mecha genre. In the 1980s and 1990s, Japanese animation saw decreased production following the economic crash in Japan. This was followed by a crisis of ideas in the years to come. Against this background, Evangelion imposed new standards for the animated serial, ushering in the era of the "new Japanese animation serial", characterized by innovations that allowed a technical and artistic revival of the industry. The production of anime serials began to reflect greater author control, the concentration of resources in fewer but higher quality episodes, typically ranging from thirteen to twenty-six, a directorial approach similar to live film, and greater freedom from the constraints of merchandising.

According to TV Tokyo's Keisuke Iwata, the global spread of Japanese animation dramatically expanded due to the popularity of Evangelion. In Japan, Evangelion prompted a review of the cultural value of anime, and its success, according to Roland Kelts, made the medium more accessible to the international youth scene. With the interest in the series, otaku culture became a mass social phenomenon. The show's regular reruns increased the number of otaku, while John Lynden links its popularity to a boom in interest in literature on the Dead Sea Scrolls, Kabbalah and Christianity.

Critics traced Evangelion's influence on subsequent anime series, including Serial Experiments Lain, RahXephon, Texhnolyze, Gasaraki, 
Guilty Crown, Boogiepop Phantom, Blue Submarine No. 6, Mobile Battleship Nadesico, Rinne no Lagrange, Gurren Lagann, Dual! Parallel Trouble Adventure, Argento Soma, Pilot Candidate, Generator Gawl, and Dai-Guard. References, homages and tributes to the series are also contained in Japanese and Western media such as the third episode of Magical Shopping Arcade Abenobashi, Koi Koi Seven, Hayate the Combat Butler, Baka and Test, Regular Show, My Little Pony: Friendship is Magic, Gravity Falls, Sgt. Frog, Rick and Morty, One Hour Photo, Steven Universe, Kong: Skull Island, and Nope. The show's mixture of religion and mecha also influenced subsequent Japanese video games, including Xenogears and El Shaddai: Ascension of the Metatron.

The design and personality traits of the character Rei Ayanami were reused for many anime and manga characters of the late 1990s, such as Ruri Hoshino of Nadesico, Ruriko Tsukushima (The Droplet), Miharu (Gasaraki), Anthy Himemiya (Revolutionary Girl Utena), and Lain Iwakura (Serial Experiments Lain). The character of Asuka was parodied by Excel (Excel Saga), and some of her traits were used to create the character of Mai in Gunparade March. According to Italian critic Guido Tavassi, Evangelion's mecha design, characterized by a greater resemblance to the human figure, and the abstract designs of the Angels, also had a significant impact on the designs of future anime productions. Nobuhiro Watsuki designed several characters for Rurouni Kenshin based on characters from Neon Genesis Evangelion, namely Uonuma Usui, Honjō Kamatari and Fuji. Other artists have cited the series as an inspiration, including Makoto Shinkai and Gege Akutami for their manga Jujutsu Kaisen. In the aftermath of Evangelion, Anno reused stylistic conceits from the series in the live-action Love & Pop and the anime romance Kare Kano. Neon Genesis Evangelion also influenced music artists, such as the British band Fightstar and its debut album, Grand Unification, and the Japanese band Rey, which derived its name from the character of Rei Ayanami.

Merchandising

The popularity of Neon Genesis Evangelion extends to its merchandising, which exceeded $400 million within two years of its release. The series has established itself greatly on the Japanese market, developing a varied range of products for adult consumers, such as cell phones, laptop computers, many soundtracks, DVDs, action figures, telephone cards and an official set of Japanese coins. The stylized mecha design that would later earn praise for Evangelion was initially criticized by certain toy companies as being too difficult to manufacture, with some expressing concern that models of the Evangelion mecha "would never sell." Eventually, Sega agreed to license all toy and video game sales. At the time of the release of the Japanese film Death & Rebirth and The End of Evangelion, estimated sales of Evangelion merchandise topped $300 million, of which 70% derived from sales of video and laser discs, soundtrack CDs, single CDs, computer software and the three-volume manga. Multiple merchandising products were released during the Renewal Project, such as CDs, video games, cel-art illustrations and collectible models.

The commercial exploitation of the series for the home video market achieved record sales and remained strong over a decade later. The fame of the show has grown through home video sales, which exceeded two or three times the sales of other contemporary anime series and films. According to anime critic Guido Tavassi, the series contributed significantly to the spread of the DVD format in Japan and generated a considerable impact on the Japanese economy, calculated in billions of yen. By 2015, more than two million Evangelion pachinko and pachislot machines had been sold, generating  in revenue.

References

Citations

Bibliography

Further reading
 Patrick Drazen: Evangelion; in Anime Explosion! – The What? Why? & Wow! of Japanese Animation. Stone Bridge Press, 2014, 

 Endo, Toru. "Konna kitanai kirei na hi ni wa" ("On a day so beautiful and so ugly"). Poppu karuchaa kuritiiku (Pop Culture Critique), volume 0. 1997. 
 Gainax, Newtype. E-Mono: Neon Genesis Evangelion: All Goods Catalog. . 
 June magazine, ed. Neon Genesis Evangelion June Tokuhon: Zankoku-Na Tenshi no These ("The Neon Genesis Evangelion JUNE Reader: Zankoku na Tenshi no These"). .
 Kotani, Mari. Seibo Evangelion (Evangelion as the Immaculate Virgin). Tokyo: Magajin Hausu. 1997.
 Kotani, Mari. A New Millennialist Perspective On The Daughters Of Eve. . 
 Lippit, Seiji M. Topographies of Japanese Modernism. New York: Columbia UP, 2000.
 Morikawa, Kaichiro (ed.). The Evangelion Style. .
 Yamashita, Ikuto and Seiji, Kio. Sore Wo Nasumono: Neon Genesis Evangelion Concept Design Works. .
 "Evangelion Special: Genesis of a major manga"—Mainichi Daily News
 "Evangelion Special: For producer Otsuki, success not always a bed of roses"—Mainichi Daily News
 "Understanding Evangelion"—Anime News Network

External links

Official websites
 Neon Genesis Evangelion—Gainax official Evangelion page 
 Madman Entertainment Evangelion page
 新世紀エヴァンゲリオン—King Records Evangelion page

Articles and information
 
 
 

Neon Genesis Evangelion
1995 anime television series debuts
1996 Japanese television series endings
ADV Films
Animated television series about dysfunctional families
Animated television series about robots
Anime composed by Shirō Sagisu
Anime with original screenplays
Apocalyptic anime and manga
Coming-of-age anime and manga
Existentialist anime and manga
Fiction set in 2015
Gainax
Grief in fiction
Japan Self-Defense Forces in fiction
Madman Entertainment anime
Mecha anime and manga
Metafictional television series
Mythology in popular culture
Philosophical anime and manga
Post-apocalyptic animated television series
Postmodern works
Psychological anime and manga
Tatsunoko Production
Television about mental health
Television series about ancient astronauts
Television series set in 2015
Television series set in the 2010s
Television shows set in Tokyo
Toonami
TV Tokyo original programming
Works about depression